The Medvedev Forest massacre or Orel massacre (Орловский расстрел) was a mass execution in the Soviet Union carried out by the Soviet secret police NKVD on 11 September 1941. Barely three months after the German invasion of the Soviet Union, 157 political prisoners incarcerated at Oryol Prison were executed in Medvedev Forest, just outside the Russian city of Oryol, by personal order of Joseph Stalin. This execution was one of the many massacres of prisoners hastily committed by the NKVD in 1941 in the wake of German invasion.

In 1941, the Oryol Prison contained some five thousand political prisoners. On 5 September 1941, on the order of Lavrentiy Beria, the NKVD composed a list of 170 Oryol prisoners to be executed. Beria claimed they formed the "more angry part of the prisoners" and that they "performed defeatist agitation and attempted to organize escapes with the aim of renewing underground activities". The list was sent to Stalin, who approved it. On 8 September, judges Vasiliy Ulrikh (as chairman of the collegium), Dmitri Kandybin and Vasiliy Bukanov, without any litigation and without any kind of investigation, formally sentenced 161 persons to death. By the time of the execution, some in the list had already died or had been transferred while others had been released. 

Many of those executed were foreign citizens, among them Fritz Noether, whose liberation even Albert Einstein had demanded. Other detainees executed that day include Christian Rakovsky, Sergei Efron, Olga Kameneva, Garegin Apresov, Maria Spiridonova and Dmitry Pletnyov (a famous doctor who had been sentenced to 25 years in a show trial).

References

External links
 Chapter 3 The Orel Massacres, the Killings of Senior Military Officers

1941 in Russia
Massacres in 1941
NKVD
Joseph Stalin
Lavrentiy Beria
Mass murder in 1941
Massacres in Russia
Massacres in the Soviet Union
Oryol Oblast
September 1941 events
Capital punishment in the Soviet Union